Donald Moffett (born January 20, 1955) is an American painter.

Life and work
Moffett was born in San Antonio, Texas, where he studied art and biology at Trinity University, earning a BA. He lives and works in New York City.

As a painter, Moffett extends the traditional two-dimensional frame through non-traditional techniques such as prying open the canvas to paint the backside, perforating or suturing the painting's surface, or loading it with paint forced into extreme textures. At other times, he transposes paintings into screens by incorporating video projections onto the canvas.

The subject matter of his paintings—from landscape and nature to politics and history—are poetic, provocative, and at times humorous. Moffett is recognized for his keen artistic critique of the world at large. His influence by classical painters such as Goya and Manet is manifest in his blending of the subtle with the outlandish and structural experimentation with social critique. While his artwork provides contemporary views on important topics of our modern-day lives, it is also a meditation on the timeless and universal issues of love, loss, alienation, and death.

Moffett is a founding member of Gran Fury, the artistic arm of the AIDS activist group ACT UP. On May 20, 2011, Gran Fury received an Honorary Doctorate of Fine Arts from Massachusetts College of Art and Design.

Moffett is represented by Marianne Boesky Gallery in New York, and Anthony Meier Fine Arts in San Francisco.

Selected catalogues and publications
Strange Ways: Here We Come. Donald Moffett & Felix Gonzalez Torres. Vancouver: University of British Columbia Fine Arts Gallery (1990).
The Inward Eye: Transcendence in Contemporary Art. Houston: Contemporary Arts Museum (2002).
Donald Moffett: What Barbara Jordan Wore. Chicago: Museum of Contemporary Art (2002).
Image Stream. Columbus, OH: Wexner Center for the Arts, The Ohio State University (2003).
Festschrift: Selections from a Collection. Hartford, CT: Leo Press (2008).
The Judith Rothschild Foundation Catalogue Raisonné. New York: The Museum of Modern Art (2009).
Everywhere. Sexual Diversity Policies in Art. Santiago de Compostela, Spain: Centro Galego de Arte Contemporánea (2009).
Donald Moffett: The Extravagant Vein. Houston: Contemporary Arts Museum (2011).<ref[>http://www.rizzoliusa.com/book.php?isbn=9780847837274/ Rizzoli USA]</ref>
Donald Moffett: The Radiant Future, Exhibition Catalogue. Columbus, OH: Columbus College of Art and Design (2012).

Exhibitions
2011-2012: The Extravagant Vein, mid-career survey exhibition, traveled to Contemporary Arts Museum Houston; Frances Young Tang Teaching Museum and Art Gallery, Skidmore College (Saratoga Springs, NY); and Andy Warhol Museum, Pittsburgh, PA.
2002: Donald Moffett: What Barbara Jordan Wore, Museum of Contemporary Art, Chicago

Writings and interviews
Moffett, Donald. “Sex with Sheila Hicks.” Art in America, Nov. 30, 2012.
Dunkerley Dialogue: Donald Moffett with Mason Stokes. Tang Museum, 2012.
Donald Moffett on This Will Have Been: Art, Love & Politics in the 1980s. Museum of Contemporary Art Chicago, March 21, 2012.
"Troy Schulze Chats with Donald Moffett." NPR, Nov. 28, 2011.

Permanent collections
Whitney Museum of American Art, New York;
Museum of Modern Art, New York;
Museum of Contemporary Art, Los Angeles;
Museum of Fine Arts, Boston;
Walker Art Center, Minneapolis, MN;
Museum of Contemporary Art, Chicago;
Modern Art Museum of Fort Worth.
Blanton Museum of Art, Austin

References

External links
Donald Moffett at Marianne Boesky Gallery 
Donald Moffett at Anthony Meier Fine Arts

1955 births
Artists from New York City
Living people
HIV/AIDS activists